The Wenatchee Wild is a Junior A ice hockey team in the British Columbia Hockey League. The team plays its home games at the 4,300-seat Town Toyota Center in Wenatchee, Washington. Initially, the team was part of the North American Hockey League, joining as an expansion club for the 2008–09 season, and in that time they were well known for their rivalry with the Fairbanks Ice Dogs. The Wild moved to the BCHL for 2015–16, after seeking approval from both Hockey Canada and USA Hockey for three years.

History

NAHL years (2008–2015)
On September 12, 2006, ground was broken on a new multipurpose event center that would be home to a new ice hockey team. On February 22, 2008, the North American Hockey League granted Wenatchee Junior Hockey, LLC. with conditional approval for an expansion team. On May 20, 2008, Wenatchee Junior Hockey, LLC. announced the franchise would be the "Wild." The name was chosen by a "name-the-team contest" held at local schools in Wenatchee and East Wenatchee. Other potential names for the team were the Wranglers, Bombers, Wonders, Hockeyes, Winning Walruses and Ice Busters. The Wild played their first game on September 17, 2008, losing to the Motor City Metal Jackets 2-1 in overtime. The Wild made a championship run in that first season, winning the division title but losing the championship game 3-2 in overtime. The following season, they came back and won the West Division championship in 2009–10, but were eliminated in the round-robin championship tournament.

On May 13, 2013, the Wild lost their first and only game during the 2013 Robertson Cup Championship Tournament to the Amarillo Bulls 5-0 during the Robertson Cup championship game. On January 19, 2013, USA Hockey approved the transfer of the Wenatchee Wild from the NAHL to the British Columbia Hockey League for the 2013–14 season. However, on May 14, 2013, the Wild announced they would instead relocate the franchise to Hidalgo, Texas and play as the Rio Grande Valley Killer Bees of the NAHL.

On May 22, 2013, the Wenatchee City Council approves a deal to move the Fresno Monsters to Wenatchee and keep their name and logo. The team announced that it had retained coach Bliss Littler from the previous franchise on June 4, 2013.

British Columbia Hockey League (2015–present)
On June 1, 2015, the Wenatchee Wild announced that they would be joining the British Columbia Hockey League (BCHL) for the 2015–16 season. After their third season in the BCHL, the Wild won the Fred Page Cup as the playoff champions, and the first American team to win the cup since 1979.

Season records

Robertson Cup
The Wenatchee Wild hosted the 2010 NAHL Pepsi Robertson Cup.

National Junior A Championship
The National Junior A Championship, formerly known as the Royal Bank Cup from 1996 to 2018, is the annual championship tournament for Hockey Canada's junior A hockey leagues. Depending on the year, various regional champions, qualifiers, and hosts participate in the championship tournament. The tournament usually consists of opening in a round-robin with the top four teams then advancing to a semifinal were the winners compete a championship game.

Head coaches
On November 24, 2010, the Wenatchee Wild fired Paul Baxter, their inaugural head coach. It is unspecified exactly what led to the firing of Baxter, who led the Wenatchee Wild to back-to-back West Division titles in 2008 and 2009 and made it to the Robertson Cup Finals in the Wild's first year. Baxter was replaced in December 2010 by John Becanic. On April 27, 2012, shortly after elimination from the 2012 West Division Playoffs, Coach Becanic resigned. USHL coach Bliss Littler was announced as the new head coach and director of hockey operations on May 23, 2012. Littler currently holds the record as the winningest coach in USA Hockey history (Jr. Tier I and II). Littler had been released from his duties as the USHL's Omaha Lancers head coach mid season 2011–12. Littler stepped down from coaching during the 2019–20 BCHL season citing health reasons, but stayed on as general manager. Chris Clark was named the interim head coach, but the interim tag was later removed before the eventually cancelled 2020–21 season. Littler was given a ten-year extension as general manager in 2021.

References

External links 
 Official site
 BCHL website
 NAHL website

British Columbia Hockey League teams
North American Hockey League teams
North American Hockey League
Wenatchee, Washington
Ice hockey teams in Washington (state)
2008 establishments in Washington (state)
Ice hockey clubs established in 2008